Tortula virescens is a species of moss belonging to the family Pottiaceae.

It is native to Europe and Northern America.

References

Pottiaceae